The 1975 FIBA Intercontinental Cup William Jones was the 9th edition of the FIBA Intercontinental Cup for men's basketball clubs. It took place at Varese and Cantù, Italy.

Participants

League stage
Day 1, September 13 1975

|}

Day 2, September 14 1975

|}

Day 3, September 15 1975

|}

Day 4, September 16, 1975

|}

Day 5, September 17, 1975

|}

Final standings

External links
 1975 Intercontinental Cup William Jones

1975
1975–76 in American basketball
1975–76 in South American basketball
1975–76 in European basketball
1975 in Italian sport
International basketball competitions hosted by Italy
1975 in African basketball